HMS Nautilus was a  of the Royal Navy. She was commissioned on 30 March 1910 from Thames Ironworks & Shipbuilding Company.

Service history

During the First World War, Grampus participated in the Dardanelles Campaign against the Ottoman Empire.

On 17 April 1915, in an attempt to break through the Dardanelles, the submarine  ran aground under Kephaz Point. She was fired on and disabled, her captain, Lieutenant Commander T. S. Brodie and several of her crew were killed; the remainder taken prisoner. To prevent her capture, the Royal Navy tried over the next two days to destroy the submarine. Grampus was involved in one of the many failed attempts; she was simply unable to locate E15.

On 6 August, HMS Grampus landed 11th Battalion, The Manchester Regiment of the 11th (Northern) Division inside Suvla Bay, but on the wrong part of the beach. The troops were ill-supplied and ran critically short of drinking water in the actions that followed; on 8 August, HMS Grampus cut one of her own water tanks loose and floated it ashore, which allowed the men who recovered it about a pint (0.5 litre) each.

Grampus was sold Thos. W. Ward for scrapping at Rainham, Kent on 21 September 1920.

References

Publications
 

 

Beagle-class destroyers
Ships built in Leamouth
1910 ships
World War I destroyers of the United Kingdom